Erikstad is a small village in the Mellerud Municipality in Västra Götaland County in Sweden. As of 2015 it had a population of 68 people.
It is located at the E45 road and the Norway/Vänern Line railway. The Erikstad church was built in 1881, and there is an abandoned church dated to 1686 nearby.

References

Populated places in Västra Götaland County
Populated places in Mellerud Municipality
Dalsland